Maehary (meaning "one who looks to the sky" in Guaraní) is a genus of pterosauromorph from the Late Triassic (Norian) Caturrita Formation of Rio Grande do Sul, Brazil. The genus contains a single species, M. bonapartei, known from a partial skull and fragmentary postcrania.

Discovery and naming 

The Maehary holotype specimen, CAPPA/UFSM 0300, was discovered sometime between 2002 and 2005 in layers of the Caturrita Formation (Linha São Luiz Site, Candelária Sequence, Santa Maria Supersequence) near Faxinal do Soturno, Rio Grande do Sul, Brazil. The holotype consists of a partial skull, vertebral centra, and fragmentary scapula. Another specimen has also been assigned to the genus, UFRGS-PV-0769-T, which consists of a left maxilla and was previously referred to Faxinalipterus. The specimen was originally described in 2010 as belonging to the supposed basal pterosaur Faxinalipterus. However, when Faxinalipterus was reinterpreted as a lagerpetid in 2022, the snout was removed from its hypodigm and reidentified as belonging to Maehary. 

In 2022, Kellner et al. described Maehary bonapartei as a new genus and species of pterosauromorph. The generic name, "Maehary" is derived from the Guarani-Kaiowa phrase "Ma’ehary", roughly translating to "who looks to the sky", in reference to the pterosauromorph affinities of the taxon. The specific name, "bonapartei", honors the Argentine paleontologist José F. Bonaparte.

Classification 
Kellner et al. (2022) recovered Maehary as the earliest diverging member of Pterosauromorpha. The results of their phylogenetic analysis are shown below:

References 

Late Triassic reptiles
Late Triassic reptiles of South America
Triassic Brazil
Fossils of Brazil
Fossil taxa described in 2022
Pterosauromorpha
Paraná Basin